Wilhelm Leber (born July 20, 1947) is a German mathematician and formerly chief apostle in the New Apostolic Church.

Life
Wilhelm Leber was born in Herford in Westphalia. In 1975 he earned his doctorate in mathematics at the Johann Wolfgang Goethe University of Frankfurt am Main with a dissertation entitled Konvergenzbegriffe für lineare Operatoren und Stabilitätsaussagen. After earning his degree, he began working at the University of Hamburg.

Church life
In 1990 Wilhelm Leber was ordained to the ministry of Apostle in the New Apostolic Church. When in 1992 his predecessor retired, he was ordained as a District Apostle and given charge of the regional churches in Bremen and Hamburg, and in 1994 also the church of Mecklenburg.

On May 15, 2005, he received the ministry of Chief Apostle of the New Apostolic Church, succeeding Richard Fehr.

On May 19, 2013, he was succeeded as Chief Apostle by Jean-Luc Schneider.

References

1947 births
Living people
German Christian religious leaders
People from Herford
20th-century German mathematicians
Goethe University Frankfurt alumni
Academic staff of the University of Hamburg
Members of the New Apostolic Church